David Lennon (born 1962) is an American author. His 2011 novel Echoes won the Lambda Literary Award for Gay Mystery, and four other of his novels have been finalists for Lambda Literary Awards.

Personal life 
Lennon was mostly raised in the Boston area, and though his family moved around a bit when he was a child, he considers Weston, Massachusetts his home.

Around 2016, Lennon moved to  Kennebuck, Maine with his husband, Brian.

Awards and honors

Publications 

 Deadfall (2014)
 Irish Black (2016)

Michel Doucette & Sassy Jones Mystery series 

 The Quarter Boys (2010)
 Echoes (2010)
 Second Chance (2011)
 Blue's Bayou (2011)
 Reckoning (2012)
 Fierce (2013)
 Deja Vieux (2020)

References 

Living people
Writers from Boston
American LGBT novelists
21st-century American writers
Lambda Literary Award winners
1962 births